Maria Kirilenko was the defending champion, but decided not to participate.
Ekaterina Makarova won the title, defeating Karolína Plíšková in the final, 6–3, 7–6(9–7).

Seeds

 Sabine Lisicki (second round, withdrew because of a right shoulder injury)
 Svetlana Kuznetsova (second round, withdrew because of a left hip injury)
 Sorana Cîrstea (quarterfinals)
 Ekaterina Makarova (champion)
 Elena Vesnina (quarterfinals)
 Garbiñe Muguruza (first round)
 Bethanie Mattek-Sands (first round)
 Peng Shuai (quarterfinals)

Draw

Finals

Top half

Bottom half

Qualifying

Seeds

Qualifiers

Qualifying draw

First qualifier

Second qualifier

Third qualifier

Fourth qualifier

References 
 Main Draw
 Qualifying Draw

Singles
PTT Pattaya Open - Singles
 in women's tennis